In mathematics and physics, a solitary wave can refer to 

 The solitary wave (water waves) or wave of translation, as observed by John Scott Russell in 1834, the prototype for a soliton.
 A soliton, a generalization of the wave of translation to general systems of partial differential equations
 A topological defect, a generalization of the idea of a soliton to any system which is stable against decay due to homotopy theory

zh:孤波